There are two places in Otago, New Zealand, called Goat Island

Goat Island, Otago Harbour, located close to Port Chalmers
Mapoutahi, (actually a peninsula, not an island), near Pūrākaunui